Teutonic Mythology may refer to:
Germanic paganism
Jacob Grimm's Deutsche Mythologie (1835)
Viktor Rydberg's Undersökningar i germanisk mythologi I (1886)